Adamczuk is a surname. Notable people with the surname include:

Dariusz Adamczuk (born 1969), Polish football player
Tomasz Adamczuk (1953–1993), Polish politician

See also
Adamchuk

Polish-language surnames